Alejandro Nieto (born in Montevideo, 7 January 1988) is a Uruguayan rugby union player who plays for Champagnat. He was a member of the Uruguay squad at the 2015 Rugby World Cup. 

He has been an active participant in the Uruguay qualifying run for RWC 2019, gaining the final place in pool D. This included victories over Canada, Namibia, Russia and Spain.

In 2019 Nieto signed for the Houston SaberCats.

Personal
Nieto attended St Catherine's School and the Crandon Institute.

Honours
Uruguay U20
World Rugby Under 20 Trophy: 2008

References

External links

1988 births
Living people
Expatriate rugby union players in the United States
Houston SaberCats players
Rugby union players from Montevideo
Uruguay international rugby union players
Uruguayan expatriate rugby union players
Uruguayan expatriate sportspeople in the United States
Peñarol Rugby players
Rugby union number eights
People educated at the Crandon Institute